ENAPOR (Empresa Nacional de Administração dos Portos, Portuguese for "National Company for Port Administration") is the Cape Verdean port authority. Its purpose is the administration, management and economic exploitation of the ports, terminals and zones of port jurisdiction of Cape Verde. It is a public limited company, 100% owned by the State of Cape Verde. Its current president is Jorge Pimenta Maurício. In 2017, 2,334,079 tonnes of cargo and 873,915 passengers were handled. The net income of ENAPOR was 187.8 million CVE in 2016. 

ENAPOR was established on 19 June 1982 as the successor of the former Junta Autónoma dos Portos de Cabo Verde. In 2005 there were plans to privatize ENAPOR and at least two major ports. An international tender for the sub-concession of the four major ports was launched in 2015, but this was cancelled in 2017.

Ports
ENAPOR manages the following ports:

The two busiest ports are Porto Grande and Praia, each covering about 35% of the maritime cargo traffic of Cape Verde. Several ports have been expanded and modernized recently, including Praia (2014), Palmeira (2015) and Sal Rei (2015).

See also
List of ports in Cape Verde

References

External links
 ENAPOR's official website

Transport companies of Cape Verde
Companies based in Mindelo
Companies established in 1982
1982 establishments in Cape Verde